The 2006–07 UMBC Retrievers men's basketball team represented University of Maryland, Baltimore County in the 2006–07 NCAA Division I men's basketball season. The team played in the America East Conference (AEC) and was led by head coach Randy Monroe, in his third year.

Schedule and results 

|-
!colspan=12 style=| Non-conference regular season

|-
!colspan=9 style=| America East regular season

|-
!colspan=9 style=| America East Men's tournament

Source

America East Conference standings

References 

UMBC
UMBC Retrievers men's basketball seasons
UMBC
UMBC